

Siegfried Thomaschki (20 March 1894 – 31 May 1967) was a German general during World War II who commanded the 11th Infantry Division. He was a recipient of the  Knight's Cross of the Iron Cross with Oak Leaves of Nazi Germany.

Thomaschki surrendered to the Soviet forces in the Courland Pocket on 8 May 1945. Convicted in the Soviet Union as a war criminal, he was held until 1955.

Awards and decorations
 Iron Cross (1914) 2nd Class (31 November 1914) & 1st Class (27 January 1917)
 Clasp to the Iron Cross (1939) 2nd Class & 1st Class (18 December 1939)
 German Cross in Gold on 19 December 1941 as Oberst and Arko 123
 Knight's Cross of the Iron Cross with Oak Leaves
 Knight's Cross on 1 November 1942 as Generalmajor and commander of 11. Infanterie-Division
 Oak Leaves on 11 September 1943 as Generalleutnant and commander of 11.Infanterie-Division

References

Citations

Bibliography

 
 

1894 births
1967 deaths
People from Sztum County
German Army generals of World War II
Generals of Artillery (Wehrmacht)
German Army personnel of World War I
Prussian Army personnel
Recipients of the clasp to the Iron Cross, 1st class
Recipients of the Gold German Cross
Recipients of the Knight's Cross of the Iron Cross with Oak Leaves
German prisoners of war in World War II held by the Soviet Union
People from West Prussia
Reichswehr personnel
20th-century Freikorps personnel